Langiewicz is a Polish surname. Notable people with the surname include:

 Marian Langiewicz (1827–1887), Polish resistance military leader
  (born 1940), Polish basketball player

Polish-language surnames